Victory at Sea is a documentary television series about warfare in general during World War II, and naval warfare in particular, as well as the use of industry in warfare. It was originally broadcast by NBC in the United States in 1952–1953. It was condensed into a film released in 1954. Excerpts from the music soundtrack, by Richard Rodgers and Robert Russell Bennett, were re-recorded for record albums. The original TV broadcasts comprised 26 half-hour segments—Sunday afternoons at 3pm (EST) in most markets—starting on October 26, 1952 and ending on May 3, 1953. The series, which won an Emmy award in 1954 as "best public affairs program", played an important part in establishing historic "compilation" documentaries as a viable television genre.

History
The project was conceived by Henry Salomon, who, while a U.S. Navy Lieutenant Commander during World War II, was a research assistant to historian Samuel Eliot Morison. Morison was then writing the 15-volume History of United States Naval Operations in World War II. During this period, Salomon learned of the large amounts of film that the warring navies had compiled. Salomon left the Navy in 1948 and eventually discussed his idea of a documentary series with one of his Phillips Academy and Harvard classmates, Robert Sarnoff, a rising executive at NBC television and the son of David Sarnoff, the chairman of RCA (then the owner of NBC). It was Robert Sarnoff who championed Salomon's proposal, won its approval and saw it through to completion.

NBC approved the project in 1951, with Salomon as producer and a budget of $500,000 (large for that era). His team, composed largely of newsreel veterans, searched naval archives around the world, and received complete cooperation from the U.S. Navy, which recognized the publicity value. Salomon's team compiled 60 million feet (11363 mi) of film, which was edited to about 61,000 feet for broadcast.

After the original run, NBC syndicated it to local stations, where it proved successful financially through the mid-1960s. NBC also marketed the series overseas; by 1964, it had been broadcast in 40 foreign markets. NBC created a feature-length (89-minute) motion picture condensation. The feature-length version was narrated by Alexander Scourby who replaced Leonard Graves, the narrator of the 26-part series. NBC made a distribution deal with United Artists and the film debuted in mid-1954. NBC also prepared another, 79-minute, condensation for broadcast, and it debuted on 29 December 1960 in a 90-minute evening slot as part of NBC's Project Twenty ("Project XX") series, which itself was established in 1955 as an offshoot of original Victory at Sea production unit.

Awards
Victory at Sea won many honors, including:

 a 1953 Emmy nomination for Best Public Affairs Program 
 a 1954 Emmy award for Best Public Affairs Program 
 a 1953 Peabody award. 
 the Freedoms Foundation's George Washington Medal.

Music
Salomon also signed Richard Rodgers, fresh off several successful Broadway musicals, to compose the musical score. Rodgers contributed 12 "themes"—short piano compositions a minute or two in length; these may be examined in the Rodgers Collection at the Library of Congress. Robert Russell Bennett did the orchestrating, transforming Rodgers's themes for a variety of moods, and composing much more original material than Rodgers, as may be observed in Bennett's holograph scores, archived with his papers at Northwestern University and microfilmed at the Library of Congress. Episode No. 18, for example, is entirely of Bennett's creation, and uses none of Rodgers's twelve themes. Bennett nonetheless received credit only for arranging the score and conducting NBC Symphony Orchestra members on the soundtrack recording sessions, and many writers still refer erroneously to "Rodgers's thirteen-hour score". In 1954 Rodgers recorded the VAS "Symphonic Scenario" medley (scored by Bennett) with the New York Philharmonic for Columbia Records, but it was Bennett who made the more familiar RCA Victor recordings—the first (1953) with NBC Symphony Orchestra musicians who played for the soundtrack sessions, and later with members of the Symphony of the Air, an orchestra created in the autumn of 1954 from former NBC Symphony members, identified on the albums as the RCA Victor Symphony Orchestra.

RCA issued the Rodgers-Bennett musical score in four different album versions, released on LP and CD. The listing below is based on the 1992 remastered recordings from RCA called Victory at Sea (13 tracks) and More Victory at Sea (11 tracks). Selections from More Victory at Sea are marked by an asterisk (*). Note that the More Victory at Sea album also includes "Special Effect Battle Sounds" as part of many of the tracks.

The movements and approximate timings in the RCA Victor Symphony performance are as follows:

 The Song of the High Seas – 5:02
 The Pacific Boils Over – 5:43
 Fire on the Waters – 5:58
 Guadalcanal March – 3:07
 Pelelieu* – 3:37
 Theme of the Fast Carriers – 6:44
 Hard Work and Horseplay – 3:46
 Mare Nostrum – 4:29
 Beneath the Southern Cross – 4:04
 Mediterranean Mosaic – 5:52
 Allies on the March* – 5:15
 D-Day – 5:55
 The Sound of Victory* – 6:12
 Victory at Sea – 6:14
 Voyage Into Fate* – 6:20
 Rings Around Rabaul* – 6:06
 Full Fathom Five* – 7:08
 The Turkey Shoot* – 5:18
 Ships That Pass* – 4:53
 Two If By Sea* – 6:27
 The Turning Point* – 5:24
 Symphonic Scenario* – 10:34
 Danger Down Deep – 4:53
 The Magnetic North – 5:45

The score was a favorite of U.S. President Richard Nixon, who was a Navy veteran himself, and part of it was played at his funeral. Additionally, Volume 1 of the score won "Best Engineering Contribution - Classical Recording" at the 2nd Annual Grammy Awards in 1960. The category has since been renamed "Best Engineered Album, Classical."

Rodgers's "Beneath the Southern Cross" theme was given words by Oscar Hammerstein, titled "No Other Love", and put into their 1953 musical, Me and Juliet. The May 1953 recording by RCA Victor recording artist Perry Como became a "Number One" hit on the pop charts later that year.

Home media
Though the original series Victory at Sea is in the public domain because its copyright was never renewed, the copyright on the original musical score was renewed and thus only the music remains under copyright. Victory at Sea has been released on VHS, Betamax, LaserDisc, DVD and Blu-ray. These include both unofficial and official releases. Embassy Home Entertainment produced the VHS, Betamax, and LaserDisc versions.  Newer releases include a DVD set from The History Channel/New Video under license from NBC News. In 2010, Periscope Film released the program as a three-disc Blu-ray set.  The Periscope Film release is in true 24p high definition and includes commentary tracks by film historian Peter C. Rollins. In 2012, Mill Creek Entertainment marketed the 26-episode series on two DVDs and a bonus disc running over 16 hours. The music soundtrack, originally released as an LP record, has been remastered and released on compact disc. The soundtrack has separate copyright limitations pertaining to the Rodgers and Hammerstein organization.

Episode list

Notes

Literature
 Peter C. Rollins, "Victory at Sea: Cold War Epic"Gary R. Edgerton/Peter C Rollins (eds.), Television Histories. Shaping Collective Memory in the Media Age, Kentucky 2001, pp. 103–122.
 Robert Russell Bennett music manuscripts, 1911–1981. Deering Library, Northwestern University, Evanston IL. http://findingaids.library.northwestern.edu/catalog/inu-ead-mus-archon-186

External links
 
 
 Victory at Sea at Archive.org

1952 American television series debuts
1953 American television series endings
1950s American documentary television series
American military television series
Black-and-white American television shows
Documentary television series about World War II
NBC original programming
Peabody Award-winning television programs
United States Navy in World War II